Nathan Marcellus Moore (born 10 January 1965, Stamford Hill, London, England) is an English-Indonesian singer and manager.

Career
First coming to prominence by joining the boyband Brother Beyond as their lead singer, in 1987 (when the band and their record label won an auction to record a track with the successful 1980s record producers Stock, Aitken and Waterman), Moore was subsequently in the line-up of another boyband, Worlds Apart, that became chart stars in France, Moore & the band had hits with songs such as – Je Te Donne, Quand Je Reve De Toi, Everlasting Love, Baby Come Back & Everybody – each single reaching No2 chart position in France! in 1997 the album Everybody became the 3rd best selling album that year and is in the all-time biggest sellers ever in that country.

After leaving the group, Moore ventured into music management, representing a number of Pop Idol contestants, such as Hayley Evetts.

In the late 90s Moore recorded a duet with the English popstar Kim Wilde called "If There Was Love". The duet was never commercially released, but Moore gave it away as a free download on his website in 2001.

In the 2000s, he found himself as a reality TV personality, not only as a singer on music revival programme Hit Me Baby One More Time, but also as Lisa Scott-Lee's manager on the MTV Europe programme Totally Scott-Lee.

In April and May 2006, Moore appeared as the band manager in the E4/Channel 4 television programme, Boys Will Be Girls, a six-week series featuring singers who had previously been in groups such as the Fast Food Rockers and Scooch. On 18 July 2006, Moore issued a statement, via his website, announcing that he had stopped managing acts..
"...I would like to let you know that I am no longer managing acts. I will be concentrating on TV / radio work plus recording new music and live (sic) singing! The only artist now managed by Hyperactive from my singers is James Fox".

In 2007, Moore decided, with Steve Hart and Cal Cooper, to make a comeback with Worlds Apart in France, a best of album was released and since then the band have regularly come together for tours and shows across France.

Moore continues to tour extensively as a solo artist, occasionally with Brother Beyond in the nostalgia circuit, and more recently alongside a re-formed Worlds Apart. On 7 February 2015 Moore appeared on BBC1's talent show The Voice but did not make it through to the second round.

Personal life

Moore married Donna Fisher on 8 September 2007, in Majorca, Spain. In August 2010, Donna gave birth to the couple's first child together, a son.

Discography
Nathan Moore is featured on every Brother Beyond and every Worlds Apart release

Brother Beyond (1985–1991)

Worlds Apart (1994–2008)

See also
David White
James Fox

References

External links
Nathan Moore Official: includes a detailed history and discography of Brother Beyond.
Nathan Moore – Site Web Francophone: french website with many videos, photos and more...
MySpaceTV: short clip of Brother Beyond being interviewed in 1988.
EveryHit.com: UK Top 40 Database

Living people
1965 births
Brother Beyond members
English male singers
English pop singers
People from Stamford Hill
Worlds Apart (band) members